Kerben may refer to:

Kerben, Kyrgyzstan, a city in Jalal-Abad oblast, Kyrgyzstan 
Kerben, Germany, a village in Rhineland-Palatinate, Germany